Sujarinee Vivacharawongse (26 May 1962), born Yuvadhida Polpraserth, stage-named Yuvadhida Suratsawadee or nicknamed Benz, is a Thai actress who was a consort and then the second wife of Vajiralongkorn, then the Crown Prince of Thailand, from 1994 to 1996. She now lives in the United States.

Early life 
Sujarinee was born on 26 May 1962, the daughter of Thanit  Polpraserth and Yaovalak Komarakul na Nagara. Her father was a musician and composer in the Sunthraphon band.

Career 

In August 1979, she announced her retirement from the entertainment industry.

Marriage and divorce 
When Vajiralongkorn was introduced to Yuvadhida Polpraserth, she was an aspiring actress. She became his steady companion and gave birth to four sons and a daughter:

 Prince Juthavachara Mahidol ( Chuthawat Mahidon, born 29 August 1979), married Riya Gough on 1 September 2013.
 Prince Vacharaesorn Mahidol ( Watchareson Mahidon, born 27 May 1981)
 Prince Chakriwat Mahidol ( Chakkriwat Mahidon, born 26 February 1983)
 Prince Vatcharawee Mahidol ( Watcharawi Mahidon, born 14 June 1985)
 Princess Busyanambejra Mahidol ( Butnamphet Mahidon, born 8 January 1987)

They were married at a palace ceremony in February 1994, where they were blessed by the King and the Princess Mother, but not by the Queen. After the marriage, she was allowed to change her name to Mom Sujarinee Mahidol na Ayudhya, signifying she was a commoner married to a royal. She was also commissioned as a major in the Royal Thai Army and took part in royal ceremonies with Vajiralongkorn. When she fled to Britain in 1996 with their children, Vajiralongkorn had posters placed around his palace accusing her of committing adultery with Anand Rotsamkhan, a 60-year-old air marshal.

Sujarinee, together with her children, moved to England in 1996. While she and her sons are reportedly banished from Thailand, her only daughter, Princess Busyanambejra (later changed to HRH Princess Sirivannavari) returned to Thailand to live with Vajiralongkorn. Sujarinee and her sons have since moved to the United States.

Filmography

Film

Drama

Royal decorations
 1995 –  Commander (Third Class) of the Most Exalted Order of the White Elephant
 1993 –  Commander (Third Class) of the Most Noble Order of the Crown of Thailand

References

External links

1962 births
Living people
Sujarinee Vivacharawongse
Sujarinee Vivacharawongse
Thai expatriates in the United Kingdom
Thai expatriates in the United States
Sujarinee Vivacharawongse
Sujarinee Vivacharawongse
Sujarinee Vivacharawongse
Sujarinee Vivacharawongse
20th-century Chakri dynasty